Midnight Sunshine is a 1984 studio album from Kikki Danielsson. She went to Nashville, Tennessee in the United States to record "Midnight Sunshine" in the Star Gem Studio. The album also entered the Swedish Albums Chart, peaking at number 24. The album was re-released to CD in 1995.

Track listing

Contributing musicians
Stu Basore, Steel guitar
Haywood Bishop, drums
Kikki Danielsson, Vocals
Leo Jackson, guitar
Mike Leech, bass
Roger Morris, keyboard
Bil VornDick Engineer

Charts

References

1984 albums
Kikki Danielsson albums